Odd Molly International AB is a Swedish clothing company founded 25 March 2002. 
Their main production is in clothing and accessories, but new product categories are planned such as sunglasses and optical lenses.

Odd Molly International AB is listed on the Stockholm Stock Exchange since June 2007 (list: First North).

The company's founders are Karin Jimfelt-Ghatan, Per Holknekt, and Christer Andersson. The board is situated in Stockholm.

Number of shareholders was 3 367 at 31 December 2008 and 95 percent was registered in Sweden. Odd Molly International AB's turnover was 267,7 MSEK 2008. Their products can be found in more than 1600 shops in more than 38 countries.

References

External links
OddMollys homepage

Clothing companies of Sweden
Clothing brands of Sweden
Clothing brands of Stockholm
Companies listed on Nasdaq Stockholm
Swedish brands
Swedish fashion
Manufacturing companies based in Stockholm
2002 establishments in Sweden
Clothing companies established in 2002